Chara is a genus of charophyte green algae in the family Characeae. They are multicellular and superficially resemble land plants because of stem-like and leaf-like structures. They are found in freshwater, particularly in limestone areas throughout the northern temperate zone, where they grow submerged, attached to the muddy bottom. They prefer less oxygenated and hard water and are not found in waters where mosquito larvae are present. They are covered with calcium carbonate deposits and are commonly known as stoneworts.  Cyanobacteria have been found growing as epiphytes on the surfaces of Chara, where they may be involved in fixing nitrogen, which is important to plant nutrition.

Structure 
The branching system of Chara species is complex with branches derived from apical cells which cut off segments at the base to form nodal and internodal cells alternately. The main axes bear whorls of branches in a superficial resemblance to Equisetum (a vascular plant).  They are typically anchored to the littoral substrate by means of branching underground rhizoids. Chara plants are rough to the touch because of deposited calcium salts on the cell wall. The metabolic processes associated with this deposition often give Chara plants a distinctive and unpleasant smell of hydrogen sulfide.

Morphology

The plant body is a gametophyte. It consists of the main axis (differentiated into nodes and internodes), dimorphic branches (long branch of unlimited growth and short branches of limited growth), rhizoids (multicellular with oblique septa) and stipulodes (needle-shaped structures at the base of secondary laterals).

Reproduction 

Chara reproduces vegetatively and sexually. Vegetative reproduction takes place by tubers, amylum stars and secondary protonemata.
The sex organs are a multicellular and jacketed globule or antheridium (male) and nucule or archegonium (female). The antheridia and archegonia may occur on separate plants (dioicy), together on the same plant (conjoined monoicy) or separately on the same plant (sejoined monoicy). After fertilization, the zygote develops into an oospore.

Species

Distribution

Chara has a cosmopolitan distribution, from 69 degrees north in northern Norway to about 49 degrees south in Kerguelen Islands (Pal et al., 1962). About 27 species are found in India.
There are about 40 species of Chara in Europe, where they are commonly found in the specific habitat-type designated as H3140 (hard oligo-mesotrophic waters with benthic vegetation of Chara spp h1) in the Natura 2000 plans of the European Union. Although this habitat is found all across Europe, it is threatened and to be protected and preserved.

The Netherlands are home to 20 species of Chara, growing in lakes and ponds of the habitat-type H3140. The H3140 habitats in the Netherlands, are considered important in the overall preservation efforts and therefore also for the Chara species in general.

Denmark. Here, many former Chara habitats (H3140) have been polluted by either toxins or excessive amounts of nutrients (in particular phosphates and nitrogen), but a few large lakes and ponds remain. Chara is found growing in the very clean hard water lakes of Thy National Park like Nors Sø for example. Tissø lake (fourth-largest lake in Denmark) is also a H3140 habitat and contains Chara species.

Ireland:- Co. Galway. Eglinton Canal Chara virgata Kütz., Chara rudis (A.Braun) Leonhardii and Nitella flexilis (L.) C.Agardh.

References 

Charophyta
Charophyta genera
Extant Silurian first appearances